Hyalobagrus leiacanthus is a species of bagrid catfish endemic to Indonesia where it is known only from the Kapuas River and the Barito River basins in central Borneo.

References 
 

Bagridae
Freshwater fish of Borneo
Taxa named by Heok Hee Ng
Taxa named by Maurice Kottelat
Fish described in 1998